Automated Insights ("Ai") is an American-based technology company that specializes in natural language generation (NLG) software that turns big data into readable narratives.

Automated Insights produced 300 million pieces of content in 2013, which Mashable reported was greater than the output of all major media companies combined. In 2014, the company's software generated one billion stories. In 2016, Automated Insights produced over 1.5 billion pieces of content.

In October 2015, Automated Insights released their Wordsmith software for beta testing to allow organizations access to natural language generation technology as a SaaS offering.

History 
The company was founded by Robbie Allen while he was a full-time engineer at Cisco Systems. Formerly known as StatSheet, the company changed its name to Automated Insights in 2011 to mark its expansion into content generation for industries outside of sports.

Automated Insights was acquired by Vista Equity Partners in February 2015, but remains independent.

Natural Language Generation 
Automated Insights provides natural language generation (NLG) technology in the form of their Wordsmith platform. Natural language generation is a software process that automatically turns data into human-friendly prose. Normally, structured data is fed into NLG software and run through a narrative template, producing content that reads as if a human writer created it. The technology is used mostly in instances that require a routine, large-scale production of content in which each narrative is similarly structured. Some proven uses of natural language generation include the following types of content:
 product descriptions from inventory data
 business intelligence dashboard text explanations
 customer communications that require personalization
 real estate market property descriptions 
 corporate earnings reports

Products

Wordsmith 

Wordsmith is Ai's platform for natural language generation. It is "an artificial intelligence system that uses mounds of data, quantitative analysis and some rules about style and good writing" to produce stories. Wordsmith is sold as both a direct product and service to clients. In October 2015, the Wordsmith platform was updated to allow users to create their own narratives through online software. Software users upload their own data and create templates for writing narratives.

Wordsmith has been described as a "a sort of personal data scientist, sifting through reams of data that might otherwise go un-analyzed and creating custom reports that often have an audience of one." The service works by ingesting structured data, analyzing it for insights, and then writing out those insights in human-friendly prose.

The company has since commercialized the natural language generation platform called Wordsmith, with customers including Yahoo, Associated Press, and Tableau.

Notable work

Associated Press 

In June 2014, The Associated Press announced it would use automation technology from Automated Insights to produce most of its U.S. corporate earnings stories. AP said automation would boost its output of quarterly earnings stories nearly fifteen-fold, further noting that the technology would "free journalists to do more journalism and less data processing." The Associated Press is the first newsroom to have an automation editor to oversee automated articles. Use of the Automated Insights software increased the Associated Press coverage of corporate earnings stories by over tenfold. A study by researchers at Stanford and the University of Washington found that Automated Insights’ technology has had an effect on the stock market, as firms that received little attention from traders now see significant increases in trade volume and liquidity.

The Daily Show with Trevor Noah aired a segment on the AP's use of automation on October 7, 2015.

Yahoo 

Automated Insights (Ai) generates personalized recaps and previews for Yahoo Sports Fantasy Football.

Partnerships and integrations 
As of June 2017, Automated Insights partnerships and integrations include Amazon Alexa, Tableau, TIBCO Spotfire, MicroStrategy, Zapier, Microsoft Excel, and Google Sheets.

Other

Other Automated Insights work includes automation of marketing reports with the company's Wordsmith for Marketing tool and content generated for Comcast, Edmunds.com, GreatCall, DigitalSTROM, and Bodybuilding.com.

References

External links 
Official Website

Technology companies of the United States
Technology companies established in 2007
Natural language generation